The 13409 / 10 Malda Town - Jamalpur Junction Intercity Express is an Express express train belonging to Indian Railways Eastern Railway zone that runs between  and  in India.

Coaches
The 13409 / 10 Malda Town - Jamalpur Junction Intercity Express has 17 general unreserved & 1 chaircar and 2 EOG coaches . It does not carry a pantry car coach.

As is customary with most train services in India, coach composition may be amended at the discretion of Indian Railways depending on demand.

Service

Routing

Traction
As the route is going to electrification, a  based WDM-3A Electric locomotive pulls the train to its destination.

References

External links
13409 Intercity Express at India Rail Info
13410 Intercity Express at India Rail Info

Intercity Express (Indian Railways) trains
Transport in Maldah
Rail transport in West Bengal
Rail transport in Jharkhand
Rail transport in Bihar